The NBA Development League's Development Champion honor was awarded annually to the NBA Development League (D-League) team that best embodies the league's goals of developing NBA basketball talent via call-ups and assignments. The Los Angeles D-Fenders were the inaugural winners in 2011–12.

Winners

References

National Basketball Association lists
Development
Awards established in 2012
2012 establishments in the United States